Edward E. Seevers (April 10, 1862 – May 28, 1927) was an American politician in the state of Washington. He served in the Washington House of Representatives from 1895 to 1897.

References

Members of the Washington House of Representatives
1862 births
1927 deaths
Washington (state) Populists
People from Sedro-Woolley, Washington